Emmett is a city in Gem County, Idaho, United States. The population was 6,557 at the 2010 census, up from 5,490 in 2000.  It is the county seat and the only city in the county. Emmett is part of the Boise−Nampa, Idaho Metropolitan Statistical Area.

History
The Payette River was named after Francois Payette, a fur trader from Quebec who was put in charge of old Fort Boise in 1818 and traveled through the area. Permanent settlement began in the early 1860s, after gold discoveries in the Boise Basin brought people over the established stage and pack train routes. Two of these trails joined at the Payette River north of the present river bridge in Emmett.

Originally it was called Martinsville after Nathaniel Martin. Next, the name was changed to "Emmettville," because it was primarily a post office named after Emmett Cahalan, the son of Tom Cahalan, an early settler of the area. The post office was later moved but retained the name. A few years later the "ville" was dropped and the post office and town became simply Emmett. In 1883 James Wardwell had the town platted, and in 1900 the town was incorporated as Emmett. Later, in March 1902, the Idaho Northern railroad came to the valley.

After the closing of the mines in 1906, the power lines were extended to Emmett. A series of irrigation projects made it possible for more rapid expansion of the town as the major service center for a farming and fruit-growing valley. In the early 1900s fruit packers adopted the label of "Gem of Plenty" because of the fertility of the valley. During the mining era the valley was known as the "garden" for the mining regions.

While campaigning for a return to Congress in 1934, Robert M. McCracken died in an automobile accident near Emmett. His vehicle went through a guard rail and tumbled down Freezeout Hill.

Until 2001, the city was home to a Boise Cascade manufacturing facility. The Black Canyon diversion dam on the Payette River, built in the early 1920s, is east of the city.

Geography

Climate
Emmett experiences a semi-arid climate (Köppen BSk) with cold, moist winters and hot, dry summers.

Demographics

2020 census
Note: the US Census treats Hispanic/Latino as an ethnic category. This table excludes Latinos from the racial categories and assigns them to a separate category. Hispanics/Latinos can be of any race.

As of the 2020 United States census, there were 7,647 people, 2,773 households, and 1,790 families residing in the city.

2010 census
As of the census of 2010, there were 6,557 people, 2,616 households, and 1,635 families living in the city. The racial makeup of the city was 91.1% White, 0.2% African American, 0.6% Native American, 0.7% Asian, 0.1% Pacific Islander, 4.6% from other races, and 2.6% from two or more races. Hispanic or Latino of any race were 12.7% of the population.

There were 2,616 households, of which 33.6% had children under the age of 18 living with them, 44.5% were married couples living together, 13.0% had a female householder with no husband present, 5.0% had a male householder with no wife present, and 37.5% were non-families. 32.3% of all households were made up of individuals, and 17.2% had someone living alone who was 65 years of age or older. The average household size was 2.46 and the average family size was 3.12.

The median age in the city was 36.3 years. 27.2% of residents were under the age of 18; 8.4% were between the ages of 18 and 24; 24.7% were from 25 to 44; 22.3% were from 45 to 64; and 17.4% were 65 years of age or older. The gender makeup of the city was 48.4% male and 51.6% female.

2000 census
As of the census of 2000, there were 5,490 people, 2,095 households, and 1,412 families living in the city. The racial makeup of the city was 90.60% White, 0.07% African American, 0.75% Native American, 0.44% Asian, 0.15% Pacific Islander, 5.79% from other races, and 2.20% from two or more races. Hispanic or Latino of any race were 11.57% of the population.

There were 2,095 households, out of which 34.4% had children under the age of 18 living with them, 50.5% were married couples living together, 12.9% had a female householder with no husband present, and 32.6% were non-families. 28.3% of all households were made up of individuals, and 14.9% had someone living alone who was 65 years of age or older.  The average household size was 2.55 and the average family size was 3.13.

In the city, the population was spread out, with 28.4% under the age of 18, 9.1% from 18 to 24, 26.3% from 25 to 44, 18.4% from 45 to 64, and 17.8% who were 65 years of age or older.  The median age was 35 years. For every 100 females, there were 90.6 males.  For every 100 females age 18 and over, there were 85.5 males.

The median income for a household in the city was $26,480, and the median income for a family was $34,663. Males had a median income of $30,598 versus $19,088 for females. The per capita income for the city was $13,027.  About 16.3% of families and 17.8% of the population were below the poverty line, including 23.4% of those under age 18 and 16.5% of those age 65 or over.

Infrastructure

Highways
 - SH-16 (south) - connects to Eagle/Boise (southeast) via  SH-44
 - SH-52 - to Payette/Ontario (west) and Horseshoe Bend (east)

Notable people
 Carlos Bilbao, member of the Idaho House of Representatives.
 Sarah Downs, 2013 Miss Idaho.
 Hattie Johnson, Olympic shooter.
 Brad Little, Governor of Idaho
 Aaron Paul, Emmy Award-winning actor born in Emmett.
 Clayne L. Pope, professor of economics at Brigham Young University.
 Paul Graham Popham, U.S. Special Forces Vietnam, Bronze Star. General Manager McGraw Hill, Inc.  AIDS activist.
 Steven Thayn, member of Idaho Senate
 Ammon Bundy, leader of the Occupation of the Malheur National Wildlife Refuge

See also
 Emmett High School

References

External links

 
 Chamber of Commerce - Emmett and Gem County
 Exposure to fallout haunts Idaho towns

Cities in Idaho
Cities in Gem County, Idaho
County seats in Idaho
Boise metropolitan area